Soholt Peaks are a group of rugged, ice-free peaks rising between Gifford Peaks and Drake Icefall in the Heritage Range of the Ellsworth Mountains in Antarctica. They were named by the University of Minnesota Ellsworth Mountains Party of 1962–63 for Donald E. Soholt, a geologist with that party. The Soholt Peaks were first traversed in December 2013 by Ralf Laier, Pachi Ibarra and Seth Timpano in Alpine style. The expedition was split into two phases due to adverse weather conditions and lasted in total eight days and six nights. It included the First Ascent of First Soholt Peak 2328m, Eley Peak (2311m), Lillywhite Peak (2321m), Fourth  Peak (22610m), Rooster Comb Ridge (2250m), Cerro Catedral (2412m), Mount Macalester (2480m) and also the First Descent via the Phylon Ice Fall.

Features
Geographical features include:

 Balish Glacier
 Conglomerate Ridge
 Eley Peak
 Mount Bursik
 Mount Macalester
 Schanz Glacier
 Yochelson Ridge

References

Ellsworth Mountains
Mountains of Ellsworth Land